Walter McKenzie Clark (August 19, 1846 – May 19, 1924) was a North Carolina politician and attorney who served as an associate justice (1889–1903) and chief justice (1903–1924) of the North Carolina Supreme Court.

Biography
Clark was born in Halifax County, North Carolina to General David Clark and Anna M. Thorne. He attended the University of North Carolina at Chapel Hill where he was a member of the Philanthropic Society. His portrait currently hangs in the chamber of the Philanthropic Society wherein aspiring members are expected to memorize his contributions to North Carolina. He served as an officer in the Confederate States Army, in 1861 as a Lt. with the 22nd and in 1862 as an Adjutant in 35th North Carolina Infantry regiments during the American Civil War before enrolling at the University of North Carolina at Chapel Hill. After graduating first in his class in 1864, he returned to the war as commanding officer (Major) of the 6th Battalion, North Carolina Junior Reserves. The battalion was quickly integrated into the 1st Junior Reserves Regiment, also known as 70th North Carolina Infantry Regiment, of which he became the lieutenant colonel in 1865. In the 1870s, Clark moved to Raleigh, North Carolina, practiced law, and wrote books on law and history.  Clark was married on 27 January 1875 to Susan Washington Graham, daughter of William Alexander Graham.

In April 1885, Governor Alfred M. Scales appointed Clark a judge of the superior court, and in 1889, Gov. Daniel G. Fowle elevated him to the state Supreme Court. He was elected to the Supreme Court in 1890, and in 1894, was re-elected with the support of not only his own Democratic Party, but also that of the Republicans and Populists.

Clark was elected chief justice in 1902 and re-elected several times. In 1912, he unsuccessfully ran for the United States Senate as a liberal reformer against fellow Democrat Furnifold Simmons. Clark died in office in Raleigh on May 19, 1924. He was buried at Oakwood Cemetery.

Legacy
Clark's five children attended North Carolina State University.  They include Walter Clark, Jr., who is considered to be the youngest person to ever graduate from the university, and David Clark, who later served on the University of North Carolina Board of Trustees.  Clark Dining Hall and David Clark Labs are named after Walter and David, respectively.

References

External links
 Dictionary of North Carolina Biography
 OurCampaigns.com biography
 North Carolina Manual of 1913
 North Carolina Historical Marker
 Address by Chief Justice Walter Clark Before the Federation of Women's Clubs, New Bern, N. C., 8 May, 1913
 
 

1846 births
1924 deaths
People of North Carolina in the American Civil War
University of North Carolina at Chapel Hill alumni
People from Halifax County, North Carolina
North Carolina Democrats
Chief Justices of the North Carolina Supreme Court
Politicians from Raleigh, North Carolina
Confederate States Army officers